= Mande Kaba =

Possible capital of the medieval Mali Empire

Mande Kaba is a name associated with the proposed capital of the medieval Mali Empire. The location and identity of Mande Kaba have been subjects of ongoing historical debate and scholarly inquiry, as no definitive archaeological evidence has confirmed its existence. The name appears frequently in Mandé oral traditions, where it is referred to as the heartland of imperial Mali's power and wealth.

Historians have yet to agree on whether Mande Kaba was a real historical city, an amalgamation of multiple locations, or a purely mythical construct used in storytelling.

The controversy around the identity of Mande Kaba has been heightened by the attempts of colonial and postcolonial powers to define its location to serve political ends. The French, seeking to create cantons in their colonial region of Kabala, initially pushed a largely unsubstantiated narrative of Kaba being the capital of Imperial Mali. The later French pronouncement of Niani being the lost capital was equally flawed and propped up by the colonial government to serve their means.
